Bocula undilineata is a moth of the family Erebidae first described by Warren in 1912. It is found in the Himalayas.

References

Rivulinae